Louisa de Rothschild (née Montefiore), Lady de Rothschild (28 May 1821 – 22 September 1910), was an Anglo-Jewish philanthropist, and founding member of the Union of Jewish Women.

Born in England, the daughter of Abraham Montefiore, she married Baron Anthony de Rothschild in 1840, and was influential and able to push conventions that traditionally bound Jewish women at the time.

She founded the first independent Jewish women's philanthropic associations, the Jewish Ladies' Benevolent Loan Society and the Ladies' Visiting Society in London in 1840.

In 1885, she and Helen Lucas jointly paid for the cost of a nurse to work among the poor who were Jewish. Lucas would pay for two more in 1891 and 1892 and they were encouraged to use a traditional common sense approach to the help and sympathy they offered. Lucas believed that relief workers should give little priority to statistics or paperwork.

References 

1821 births
1910 deaths
English Jews
English philanthropists
Wives of baronets
Sebag-Montefiore family
Jewish women philanthropists
English women philanthropists
Jewish British philanthropists
Rothschild family